Nosaby is a village located in Kristianstad Municipality, Sweden. The clubs Nosaby IF and Nosaby GK are located here. The village is famous for a rail accident on 10 September 2004.

References

Populated places in Skåne County